The regulatory region of the repZ gene, which encodes the replication initiator of plasmid ColIb-P9, contains a pseudoknot. This acts as a molecular switch controlling translation of repZ and repY.

References

External links 
Rfam entry for Regulatory region of repZ gene

Non-coding RNA